Trupanea amoena is a species of tephritid or fruit flies in the genus Trupanea of the family Tephritidae.

Distribution
Palearctic Region, Ethiopia, India, Sri Lanka, Australia.

References

Tephritinae
Insects described in 1857
Taxa named by Georg Ritter von Frauenfeld
Diptera of Europe
Diptera of Asia
Diptera of Australasia